The Chestnut Tree is a short film which made its debut at the Laemmle Sunset 5 and then showed in the Austin Film Festival and the San Diego Asian Film Festival. It is a 2-D hand-drawn short film about a little girl and her mother that revisit memories under the chestnut tree. It is animated by Hyun-min Lee.

Reception
It was nominated for two Annie Awards, for Best Animated Short Subject and Animation Production Artist in the 35th Annual Annie Awards.

References

External links
Animated Views

2000s animated short films
2007 films
2007 short films
2007 animated films